Piura District is one of ten districts of the province Piura in Peru.

History

Geography 

 Piura river

Authorities

Mayors 

 2019–2022: Juan José Díaz Dios
 2015–2018: Óscar Raúl Miranda Martino
 2011–2014: Ruby Consuelo Rodríguez Vda. de Aguilar
 2007–2010: José Eugenio Aguilar Santisteban

See also 

 Administrative divisions of Peru

References

External links 

 INEI Peru